Gusti may refer to:

Dimitrie Gusti (1880–1955), Romanian sociologist, ethnologist, historian, and  philosopher
Gusti Huber (1914–1993), Austrian theater and film actress
Gusti Ngurah Made Pemecutan (died 1810), King in Badung
Gusti Wolf (1912–2007), Austrian stage, film, and television actress
I Gusti Bayu Sutha (born 1977), Indonesian footballer
I Gusti Ketut Pudja (1908–1977), Indonesian politician
I Gusti Made Oka Sulaksana (born 1971), Indonesian professional sailor and windsurfer
I Gusti Ngurah Rai (1917–1946), commanded Indonesian forces in Bali during the War of Independence
I Gusti Nyoman Lempad (1862–1978), Indonesian stone sculptor and architect
I Gusti Putu Phalgunadi, Indonesian scholar and translator from Kawi to English
I Gusti Putu Martha (1913–1992), Indonesian politician